Polat Keser (born 4 December 1985 in Marl) is a German–born Turkish football goalkeeper who plays for Ceyhanspor.

Career

Statistics

References

External links

 Polat Keser Interview

1985 births
Living people
Turkish footballers
VfL Bochum players
VfL Bochum II players
Antalyaspor footballers
Association football goalkeepers
Süper Lig players
Turkey youth international footballers
People from Marl, North Rhine-Westphalia
Sportspeople from Münster (region)
TSV Marl-Hüls players
Footballers from North Rhine-Westphalia